Abrahámsky Park is a nature reserve in the Slovak municipality of Abrahám. It covers an area of 10.85 ha and has a protection level of 4.

History
The park was created during the nineteenth century, when the floodplain forest along the Dudváh river was transformed into parkland surrounding the castle, which was used a sanatorium. The park is directly adjacent to the forest complex of Časlov.

Flora
The park consists mostly of deciduous trees, of which oak is the most abundant.

References

Geography of Trnava Region
Protected areas of Slovakia